The Yuman–Cochimí languages are a family of languages spoken in Baja California, northern Sonora, southern California, and western Arizona. Cochimí is no longer spoken as of the late 18th century, and most other Yuman languages are threatened.

Classification
There are approximately a dozen Yuman languages. The dormant Cochimí, attested from the 18th century, was identified after the rest of the family had been established, and was found to be more divergent. The resulting family was therefore called Yuman–Cochimí, with Yuman being the extra-Cochimí languages.

 Cochimí † (Northern Cochimí and Southern Cochimí may have been distinct languages)
 Kiliwa
 Core Yuman
 Delta–California Yuman
Ipai (a.k.a. 'Iipay, Northern Diegueño)
Kumeyaay (a.k.a. Central Diegueño, Campo, Kamia)
Tipai (a.k.a. Southern Diegueño, Huerteño, Ku'ahl)
Cocopah (a.k.a. Cucapá; cf. Kahwan, Halyikwamai)
 River Yuman
Quechan (a.k.a. Yuma)
Maricopa (a.k.a. Pii-Paash; cf. also Halchidhoma)
Mojave
 Pai
Yavapai
Havasupai-Hualapai (a.k.a. Northern Yuman)
 Hualapai dialect (a.k.a. Walapai)
Havasupai dialect
Paipai (a.k.a. Akwa'ala; possibly distinct from the Upland Yuman language only at the dialect level)

Cochimí is now dormant. Cucapá is the Spanish name for the Cocopa. Diegueño is the Spanish name for Ipai–Kumeyaay–Tipai, now often referred to collectively as Kumeyaay.  Upland Yuman consists of several mutually intelligible dialects spoken by the politically distinct Yavapai, Hualapai, and Havasupai.

Proto-language

Urheimat 
Mauricio Mixco of the University of Utah points to a relative lack of reconstructible Proto-Yuman terms for aquatic phenomena as evidence against a coastal, lacustrine, or riverine Urheimat.

Reconstruction 
Proto-Yuman reconstructions by Mixco (1978):

{| class="wikitable sortable"
! gloss !! Proto-Yuman
|-
| be || *wi/*yu
|-
| be located (sg) || *wa
|-
| belly || *pxa; *p-xa
|-
| big || *tay
|-
| bird || *č-sa
|-
| body hair || *mi(ʔ)
|-
| bone || *ak
|-
| breasts || *ñ-maːy
|-
| cat || *-mi(ʔ)
|-
| causative || *x-
|-
| chief man || *-pa/*(ma)
|-
| chief, lord || *-pa/*ma
|-
| cold || *x-čur
|-
| cry || *mi(ʔ)
|-
| dance || *-ma(ʔ)
|-
| daughter || *p-čay
|-
| die || *pi
|-
| die (sg) || *pi
|-
| do || *wi/uːy
|-
| do; make || *wi/*uy
|-
| dog || *(č)-xat
|-
| dove || *k-wi(ʔ)
|-
| drink || *(č)-si; *si ?
|-
| ear || *ṣma(k)l ~ *ṣmal(k)
|-
| earth, place || *ʔ-mat
|-
| eat (hard food) || *č-aw
|-
| eat (soft food) || *ma
|-
| extinguish || *spa
|-
| eye || *yu(w)
|-
| face || *yu(w) (p)-xu
|-
| fall || *-nal
|-
| father || *n-ʔay; *-ta; *-ku ?
|-
| feather || *-waR
|-
| fire || *ʔ-ʔa(ː)w
|-
| give || *wi; *ʔi
|-
| he || *ña/*ya-
|-
| head || *ʔi(y)
|-
| hear || *kʷi(ː)
|-
| heaven, sky || *ʔ-ma(ʔ)y
|-
| horn || *kʷa ?
|-
| hot || *paR
|-
| house || *ʔ-wa(ʔ)
|-
| husband || *miːy
|-
| imperative prefix || *k-
|-
| irrealis || *-x(a)
|-
| kill || *pi
|-
| leaf || *ṣmak; *smaR
|-
| lie (be prone) || *yak
|-
| locative || *wa-l
|-
| locative (illative) || *-l
|-
| locative (thither) || *-m
|-
| man, male || *-miː(y); *maː(y)
|-
| man, person || *-pa/*ma
|-
| mother || *-tay; *-siy
|-
| mountain lion || *-miʔ tay
|-
| mountain sheep || *ʔ-mu(w)
|-
| mouth || *(y-)a
|-
| name || *maR
|-
| navel || *-pu
|-
| neck/nape || *iː-(m)puk ?
|-
| non-present aspect || *t
|-
| nose || *(p-)xu
|-
| object, plural || *pa
|-
| object, unspec. (anim.) || *ñ-
|-
| perceive || *kʷi
|-
| possessive prefix (inal.) || *ñ
|-
| prefixes (trans.) || *-, *m, *Ø
|-
| priest || *maː(y)
|-
| pronominal prefixes (stative) || *ñ, *m-, *w-
|-
| pronominal subject || *ʔ-, *m-, *Ø
|-
| rabbit || *pxar
|-
| reed || *xta
|-
| relative pronoun || *ña-/*ya
|-
| relativizer || *kʷ-
|-
| salt || *-ʔiR (< *s-ʔiR)
|-
| say || *ʔi
|-
| shaman || *-maː(y)
|-
| sit || *waː
|-
| skunk || *-xʷiw
|-
| sleep || *ṣma
|-
| son (w.s.) || *s-ʔaːw ?
|-
| star || *xmṣi
|-
| subject suffix || *-č; *-m
|-
| sun, day || *paR
|-
| that || *-ña/*-ya
|-
| there || *ña/*ya
|-
| thing, something || *ʔ-č
|-
| third person || *ña-/*ya
|-
| this || *p-u
|-
| thorn || *ʔ-ta(ː)t
|-
| three || *x-muk
|-
| to blow || *p-č/sul
|-
| tongue || *ʔimpal; *(y)pal; *-paR
|-
| two || *x-wak
|-
| water || *-xa(ʔ); *si
|-
| we || *ña-p
|-
| wife || *ku/*ki
|-
| wing || *waR
|-
| woman || *ki/*ku; *siñʔak
|-
| word || *maR
|-
| yes || *xaː
|}

References

Bibliography
 Campbell, Lyle. (1997). American Indian Languages: The Historical Linguistics of Native America. Oxford University Press.
 Goddard, Ives. (1996). "Introduction". In Languages, edited by Ives Goddard, pp. 1–16. Handbook of North American Indians, William C. Sturtevant, general editor, Vol. 17. Smithsonian Institution, Washington, D.C.
 Kendall, Martha B. (1983). "Yuman languages". In Southwest, edited by Alfonso Ortiz, pp. 4–12. Handbook of North American Indians, William C. Sturtevant, general editor, Vol. 10. Smithsonian Institution, Washington, D.C.
 Langdon, Margaret. (1990). "Diegueño: how many languages?" In Proceedings of the 1990 Hokan–Penutian Language Workshop, edited by James E. Redden, pp. 184–190. Occasional Papers in Linguistics No. 15. University of Southern Illinois, Carbondale.
 Mithun, Marianne. (1999). The Languages of Native North America. Cambridge: Cambridge University Press.  (hbk); .
 Mixco, Mauricio J. (2006). "The indigenous languages". In The Prehistory of Baja California: Advances in the Archaeology of the Forgotten Peninsula, edited by Don Laylander and Jerry D. Moore, pp. 24–41.

External links

 Comparative Yuman Swadesh vocabulary lists (from Wiktionary's Swadesh-list appendix)

 
Language families
Hokan languages
Indigenous languages of California
Indigenous languages of the North American Southwest
Indigenous languages of Mexico
Indigenous languages of the Southwestern United States
Indigenous culture of Aridoamerica